Yelena Aleksandrovna Yevtyukhova (born 7 August 1970) is a Russian politician and Member of the State Duma from Chukotka Autonomous Okrug.

Biography
Yelena Yevtyukhova was born on 7 August 1970 in Ust-Belaya village, 213 km southwest of Anadyr.

In 1987–1990 Yevtyukhova studied in Anadyr Pedagogical College of Indigenous People of the North. She graduated with a degree of "primary school teacher". In 2013 Yevtyukhova graduated Moscow State University of Economics, Statistics, and Informatics with a speciality in law.

For 25 years Yelena Yevtykhova worked in Chaunsky District. She started working as a teacher but later continued her career in public sector as main advisor at the regional Department of Indigenous People Affairs. Then she became Deputy Head of Administration of Chaunsky District.

In 2015 Governor Roman Kopin appointed Yelena Yevtyukhova as Head of the Department of Indigenous People Affairs and Deputy Head of Governor's Office. That year Yevtyukhova was also elected as chairwoman of the regional council of United Russia supporters.

For the 2021 State Duma election incumbent deputy for the Chukotka constituency Valentina Rudchenko declined to seek re-election, and Yevtyukhova ran to replace the retiring deputy. Yevtyukhova won the United Russia primary in the constituency with 28.43% of the vote. She also won a primary for Duma of Chukotka Autonomous Okrug, finishing ahead of Rudchenko in a party list contest. In the general election Yelena Yevtyukhova placed first in the constituency with 36.95% of the vote. She also was elected to the Duma of Chukotka AO but chose to work in the State Duma instead.

In the State Duma Yevtyukhova joined United Russia faction and was appointed to the Committee on Russian Far East and Arctic Development. In December 2021 Yevtyukhova changed her committee assignments and joined Duma Committee on Nationalities. She also currently serves on Liaison Deputies' Groups to the Balkan states, to Finland, and to Norway.

On 15 February 2022 Yevtyukhova was one of 351 State Duma members, who approved a letter to President Vladimir Putin, asking him to recognise the independence of Donetsk and Lugansk people's republics, both breakaway states were recognised by the Russian Federation on 21 February. Two days later the European Union placed sanctions on all 351 State Duma members who voted to approve a letter to Putin, including Yelena Yevtyukhova. On 24 March Yevtyukhova was designated by the OFAC as one of the key enablers of the Russian invasion and was put under US sanctions along with 328 fellow State Duma members.

References

Living people
1970 births
Eighth convocation members of the State Duma (Russian Federation)
21st-century Russian politicians
21st-century Russian women politicians
People from Chukotka Autonomous Okrug
United Russia politicians
Moscow State University of Economics, Statistics, and Informatics alumni
Russian individuals subject to the U.S. Department of the Treasury sanctions